Arthur Wesley Hardy Jr. (February 17, 1891 – September 1980) was an American Negro league pitcher in the 1910s.

A native of Topeka, Kansas, Hardy attended Washburn University. He pitched for the Kansas City Giants in 1911, posting a 3–1 record and a 2.87 ERA over 31.1 innings. Hardy died in Buffalo, New York in 1980 at age 89.

References

External links
Baseball statistics and player information from Baseball-Reference Black Baseball Stats and Seamheads

1891 births
1980 deaths
Kansas City Giants players